Ganes is a female pop trio from La Val, Italy founded in 2009 which sings in the Ladin language. The band consists of sisters Elisabeth Schuen, Marlene Schuen and their cousin Maria Moling.

On 14 August 2015, they performed together with Corin Curschellas, as well as Patricia Draeger and Barbara Gisler.

Gallery

Discography 
Albums:
 2010: Rai de sorëdl ("ray of sun"), Sony Music
 2011: Mai guai ("no problem")
 2012: Parores & Neores - with English bonus versions to some tracks
 2014: Caprize - with English version of the single "Bang Bang"
 2016: An Cunta Che

References

Italian pop music groups
Musical groups established in 2009
Ladin people